Out of position may refer to:

 The position in poker of a player to opponents acting after him.
 Out of position (crash testing), a passenger position which is not the normal one.
Out of Position, a novel by Kyell Gold